Glen is a forest area situated between Annadale, Summer Hill, Chaura Maidan and Boileuganj in Shimla city in the North Indian state of Himachal Pradesh. Glen is known for its natural scenic views and its nature trails.

Geography 
Glen is located below Chaura Maidan and besides Annadale, some of its part lies below the suburb of Summer Hill.

View 
Glen attracts a lot of tourists. It is a forest area which includes three trails and a gazebo. Below the major trails it also has a waterfall.

References 

Forests of India
Tourist attractions in Shimla